Koritni is an Australian rock band from Sydney, born out of the ashes of the band Green Dollar Colour.

History 

After the breaking-up of Green Dollar Colour, Lex Koritni decided to form a new band. Helped by the French guitar player Eddy Santacreu, bassist Matt Hunter, rhythm guitarist Luke Cuerten and Chris Brown on drums, they formed the band Koritni in 2006. Mixing 70's hard rock and American sleaze rock, the band doesn't hide its preferences for bands such as Aerosmith, Guns N' Roses, Van Halen or AC/DC.

In 2007, Koritni released their first full-length album Lady Luck, praised by the press, Lady Luck was mixed by Mike Fraser (AC/DC, Aerosmith and Van Halen). Following the release of the album, the band undertook a European tour.

Early 2009, the band released their second album, Game of Fools, again mixed by Mike Fraser, the album is still in a hard rock vein that made them successful. Koritni is considered with bands like Airbourne or The Answer as the rebirth of hard rock.

Members 
 Lex Koritni – vocals
 Eddy Santacreu – guitars
 Luke Cuerden – guitars
 Chris Brown – drums
 Dean Matt Hunter – bass

French guitar player Manu Livertout is replacing Luke Cuerden during the current 2012 Tour.

In 2012 and 2014, French bass player and former Trust member Yves "Vivi" Brusco replaced Dean Matt Hunter during their European tours.

Discography 
2007: Lady Luck [Bad Reputation]
2008: Red Live Joint (CD+DVD) – live [Bad Reputation]
2009: Game of Fools  [Bad Reputation]
2010: No More Bets [Bad Reputation]
2012: Welcome to the Crossroads [Verycords]
2013: Alive & Kicking (CD+DVD) – live [Verycords]
2015: Night Goes On For Days [Verycords]
2018: Rolling [Verycords]

References

External links 
 Official website
 Official Facebook

Australian hard rock musical groups
Musical groups established in 2006